is Becky's debut single under EMI Music Japan, released on December 2, 2009. It is the first single where she is credited under the name . The single is her first to debut in the Top 10. One of its B-sides  was used as the opening theme for Crayon Shin-chan.

Track listing

Charts

Oricon Sales Charts

Billboard Japan Sales Charts

Physical Sales Charts

References

External links
 

2009 singles
Becky (television personality) songs
EMI Music Japan singles
2009 songs